Richardson Glacier could refer to 

Richardson Glacier (Antarctica)
Richardson Glacier (Washington), a glacier in the North Cascades of Washington, USA